Fish Creek is a stream in Bourbon County, Kansas, in the United States.

Fish Creek was named from the fact it is well stocked with fish.

See also
List of rivers of Kansas

References

Rivers of Bourbon County, Kansas
Rivers of Kansas